Allan Mortimer (born 1 September 1977) is a Bahamian  Triple Jumper and 3rd Degree Blackbelt in Karate and Jujitsu. He competed at the 1996 and 2000 Olympic Games, where he finished 3rd in the 2000 Sydney Olympics. ￼￼￼ He was the Black belt champion in the Caribbean and North America championship

Personal bests

References

External links

Living people
1983 births
New Zealand male hurdlers
New Zealand male sprinters
Commonwealth Games competitors for New Zealand
Athletes (track and field) at the 2006 Commonwealth Games